Oh Ju-Hyun  (born 2 April 1987) is a South Korean former professional football player. He was a midfielder for Daegu FC in the K-League before being implicated in the 2011 South Korean football betting scandal. He later played for another K-League club, Jeju United, before playing for lower league clubs.

Club career 
Born on 2 April 1987, Oh was a draftee from the 2010 K-League draft intake, and joined Daegu FC for the 2010 season.  He earned a yellow card in his debut match, a loss in a K-League against the Gwangju Sangmu on 27 February 2010, and followed this up with a red card in his following game, his debut in the K-League (a loss to Jeju United). Despite this intemperate start to his professional footballing career, he established himself as a regular in the first team squad.

Remaining with Daegu for the following season, Oh was implicated in the betting scandal that was discovered in June 2011. Indicted for his involvement in match-fixing he was released by the club. In March 2013, he joined K League Classic team Jeju United. He played several games that year, but was unused for the 2014 season.

Oh transferred to K3 League club Hwaseong FC for 2015. The next year, he played in the Korea National League for Daejeon Korail FC.

Club career statistics

References

External links 

1987 births
Living people
Sportspeople from Jeju Province
Association football midfielders
South Korean footballers
Daegu FC players
Jeju United FC players
K League 1 players